Josef Kitzmüller (21 June 1912 – 14 May 1979) was an Austrian football (soccer) player who competed in the 1936 Summer Olympics. He was part of the Austrian team, which won the silver medal in the football tournament. He played two matches as forward.

References

External links
profile

1912 births
1979 deaths
Austrian footballers
Footballers at the 1936 Summer Olympics
Olympic footballers of Austria
Olympic silver medalists for Austria
Austria international footballers
Olympic medalists in football
Medalists at the 1936 Summer Olympics
Association football forwards